Louisiana Highway 46 (LA 46) is a state highway in Louisiana that serves Orleans and St. Bernard Parishes. It is demarcated as Elysian Fields Avenue and St. Claude Avenue in the city of New Orleans and as St. Bernard Highway, Bayou Road, East Judge Perez Drive, Florissant Highway and Yscloskey Highway in St. Bernard Parish. The highway is recognized by the United States Department of Transportation as San Bernardo Scenic Byway.

Route description
In New Orleans, LA 46 begins as Elysian Fields Avenue at an intersection with LA 39 (North Claiborne Avenue) and LA 3021 (Elysian Fields Avenue).  After heading south five blocks, LA 46 turns onto St. Claude Avenue and heads east.  It crosses the Industrial Canal via the St. Claude Avenue Bridge and runs through the city's Lower 9th Ward, continuing to parallel to the Mississippi River.  Approximately one-half mile east of the Orleans-St. Bernard Parish line, LA 46 becomes St. Bernard Highway. Serving as the southernmost west–east thoroughfare of the parish, it intersects LA 47 (Paris Road) and LA 3238 (Palmisano Boulevard) in Chalmette. After continuing in a south-southeast direction, the highway turns east and again meets LA 39, which has turned west, at Bayou Road. The two highways run concurrently for two miles (3 km) near the end of East Judge Perez Drive, at which point LA 46 turns east through the community of Reggio and LA 300. From there, LA 46 connects to the towns of Yscloskey (via LA 625), Shell Beach, and Hopedale (via LA 624) before ending at a dead end with the Mississippi River-Gulf Outlet Canal.

LA 46 is a divided, four-lane highway from LA 39/LA 3021/North Claiborne Avenue to LA 47/Paris Road, where it narrows to an undivided, two-lane highway from LA 47/Paris Road to the westernmost intersection with the LA 300/Bayou Road. The route again widens to four lanes and becomes a divided highway from the westernmost intersection with the LA 300/Bayou Road to the easternmost intersection with LA 300/Bayou Road before narrowing again to an undivided, two-lane roadway from the easternmost intersection with LA 300/Bayou Road to the eastern terminus at Shell Beach.

Major intersections

References

External links

La DOTD State, District, and Parish Maps
District 02
Orleans Parish
St. Bernard Parish (West Section)

0046
Transportation in New Orleans
Transportation in St. Bernard Parish, Louisiana